Amina Cruz is a photographer known for capturing queer punk scenes within the Latinx community and breaking cultural barriers with their work. Cruz captures the intimate moments shared between queer folk and is trying to expand the Latinx identity with their work.

Biography 
Cruz was born in Los Angeles, California and has lived in Tampa, Florida as well as New York and received a BFA in photography in 2002 from Parsons School of Design in New York. Cruz is currently enrolled at the University of California, Los Angeles on the MFA program and is expected to finish in 2023.

Exhibitions 
 Forging Territories: Queer Afro and Latinx Contemporary Art, San Diego Art Institute, San Diego, CA, 2019
 Round Hole Square Peg: LGBTQ Photo Show, Long Hall, West Hollywood, CA, 2018
 Paraisos: Queer LA Latinx Art, The Village at Ed Gould Plaza, Hollywood, CA, 2018

Further reading
 PUNK! Las Américas Edition, Intellect Books, 2021
 www.vice.com - Amina Cruz article
 Interview with VoyageLA
Open Studios Art UCLA

References

External links 
 Amina Cruz Photography

Living people
21st-century American artists
21st-century American photographers
Artists from Los Angeles
Wikipedia Student Program
Parsons School of Design alumni
Social documentary photographers
Year of birth missing (living people)